Erkki Aukusti Junkkarinen (22 April 1929 in Suonenjoki – 9 April 2008 in Hämeenlinna) was a Finnish singer.

Junkkarinen established his musical career in 1950 with his successful single Yksinäinen harmonikka, though in the following years his popularity began to dwindle. In the 1960s, he recorded the song Ruusut hopeamaljassa, which at the time had only limited success. In 1975, he released the same song under the different title Ruusuja hopeamaljassa. The new recording sold very well, and Junkkarinen received the first Finnish platinum record ever for his album with the same title. As he grew to an unusually large fame for an artist in Finland, he helped spread the humppa style of music.

Discography
 Yksinäinen harmonikka (1950)
 Imatran Inkeri (1951)
 Ruusut hopeamaljassa (1967)
 Ruusuja hopeamaljassa (1975)
 Lappeenrantaan (1977)
 Tulisuudelma (1978)

See also
List of best-selling music artists in Finland

References

External links
 
 Detailed Biography (in Finnish)

1929 births
2008 deaths
People from Suonenjoki
20th-century Finnish male singers